Cao Sỹ Cường (born 19 February 1984) is a retired Vietnamese footballer who played as a midfielder for V-League club Thanh Hóa and the Vietnamese internationals.

References 

1984 births
Living people
People from Thanh Hóa province
Vietnamese footballers
Association football midfielders
V.League 1 players
Hanoi FC players
Thanh Hóa FC players
Vietnam international footballers